Saint-Claude is a large district of the east of Besançon.

History 
In 1965 was built the "City of Montarmots" in Saint-Claude, who has more than 30 dwellings. The primary purpose of these units was to host the Franco-Algerian rappatriés recently (since the Algerian War)

Geography 
The area is located to the east of Besançon, near Orchamps, Fontaine-écu and Chaprais.

Enseignement

Sports and Cultural Facilities 
 Sports Complex of Saint Claude

Place of worship 
 The great mosque of Besançon
 Church of Saint Claude

Monuments 
 Cemetery of St. Claude
 Fort of justices

Other buildings 
 Funérarium-crématorium

Transports 
 The line 2 and 22 serves the area

See also 
 Besançon

Sources and references 
 French page about Saint-Claude

Areas of Besançon